The Jawaharlal Nehru Stadium is a Delhi Metro station in Delhi, on the Violet Line. As its name suggests, the station serves the Jawaharlal Nehru Stadium and its surrounding areas. The station opened in time for the Commonwealth Games Opening Ceremony, to be held on the same day at the stadium, on 3 October 2010.

Station layout

See also
List of Delhi Metro stations
Transport in Delhi
Delhi Metro Rail Corporation
Delhi Suburban Railway

References

External links

 Delhi Metro Rail Corporation Ltd. (Official site) 
 Delhi Metro Annual Reports
 
 UrbanRail.Net – descriptions of all metro systems in the world, each with a schematic map showing all stations.

Delhi Metro stations
Railway stations opened in 2010
Railway stations in South Delhi district